Hospitals in the United Kingdom are listed in the following articles:

List of hospitals in England 
List of hospitals in Wales 
List of hospitals in Scotland 
List of hospitals in Northern Ireland